Ichniotherium (meaning "marking creature") is an ichnogenus of tetrapod footprints from between the Late Carboniferous period to the Early Permian period attributed to diadectomorph track-makers. These footprints are commonly found in Europe, and have also been identified in North America and Morocco. Three ichnospecies of Ichniotherium have been proposed as valid: I. cotta, I. sphaerodactylum, and I. praesidentis.

In a 2007 study, the diadectid species Diadectes absitus was determined to be the track-maker associated with I. cotta tracks, and the related diadectid species Orobates pabsti was linked to I. praesidentis based on analysis of Lower Permian trackways and fossils skeletons in Germany

References

Trace fossils